The Coalition to Stop Gun Violence (CSGV) and the Educational Fund to Stop Gun Violence (EFSGV or Ed Fund), its sister organization, are two parts of a national, non-profit gun control advocacy organization that is opposed to gun violence. Since 1974, it has supported reduction in American gun violence via education and legislation.

History
In 1974, the United Methodist General Board of Church and Society formed the National Coalition to Ban Handguns, a group of thirty affiliated religious, labor, and nonprofit organizations, with the goal of addressing "the high rates of gun-related crime and death in American society" by requiring licensing of gun owners, registering firearms, and banning private ownership of handguns. "Reasonable limited exceptions" were to be allowed for “police, military, licensed security guards, antique dealers who have guns in unfireable condition, and licensed pistol clubs where firearms are kept on the premises.” In the 1980s and 1990s, the coalition expanded to 44 member groups.

In 1989, following the Cleveland Elementary School shooting in Stockton, California, the National Coalition to Ban Handguns changed its name to the Coalition to Stop Gun Violence, in part because the group believed that assault weapons as well as handguns, should be outlawed.

Mission
According to CSGV, its mission is: "We believe that all Americans have a right to live in communities free from gun violence. We pursue this goal through policy development, strategic engagement, and effective advocacy." The organization has nine areas of focus, regarding issues and campaigns:

 Opposition to the National Rifle Association's interpretation of Second Amendment rights.
 Support for firearm microstamping, a ballistic identification technology intended to allow law enforcement to trace the serial number of a firearm from ejected cartridge cases recovered from crime scenes. 
 Ban the private sale of guns by instituting universal background checks.
 Ban concealed carry.
 Opposition to the sale of what it classifies as assault weapons to private citizens.
 Support for "countermarketing", a strategy intended to force changes in gun industry's marketing and distribution practices.
 Opposition to removing the duty to retreat in self-defense law (i.e., stand your ground laws).
 Support for stricter mental health screening for firearm purchases.
 Support for the repeal of the Protection of Lawful Commerce in Arms Act.

Leadership
Joshua Horwitz is the Executive Director of CSGV/EFSGV. He is an attorney who joined the Education Fund in 1989 as Legal Director.
Michael K. Beard is the founding President of the CSGV/EFSGV.

Membership
CSGV consisted of 47 organizations in March 2016. Among them are religious organizations, child welfare advocacy groups, public health professionals, social justice, and political action organizations.

The member groups are:

American Academy of Pediatrics
American Association of Suicidology
American Ethical Union
American Jewish Committee
American Jewish Congress
American Psychiatric Association
American Public Health Association
Americans for Democratic Action
Association of Japanese Families of Gun Violence Victims in the U. S. A.
Baptist Peace Fellowship of North America
The Bible Holiness Movement, International
Center for Science in the Public Interest
Central Conference of American Rabbis
Children's Defense Fund
Child Welfare League of America, Inc.
Church of the Brethren
The Communitarian Network
The Council of The Great City Schools
DC for Democracy
The DISARM Education Fund
Fellowship of Reconciliation
Friends Committee on National Legislation
Jesuit Conference - Office of Social Ministries
Jewish Community Center Association
Jewish Women International
Loretto Community
National Association of School Psychologists
National Association of Social Workers
National Council of Jewish Women
National Council of Negro Women
National Urban League
North American Federation of Temple Youth
Pan American Trauma Association
Peace Action of Washington
Presbyterian Church (U.S.A.)
Union for Reform Judaism
Unitarian Universalist Association
UNITE HERE
United Church of Christ
United Federation of Teachers
United Methodist Church Board of Church & Society
United States Conference of Mayors
United States Student Association
United Synagogue of Conservative Judaism
Woman's National Democratic Club
Women's League for Conservative Judaism
YWCA of U. S. A.

References

External links

1974 establishments in the United States
Charities based in Washington, D.C.
501(c)(4) nonprofit organizations
Gun control advocacy groups in the United States
Organizations established in 1974